Romanian cuisine is a diverse blend of different dishes from several traditions with which it has come into contact, but it also maintains its own character. It has been mainly influenced by Turkish and a series of European cuisines in particular from the Balkans, or Hungarian cuisine as well as culinary elements stemming from the cuisines of Central Europe. 

Romanian cuisine includes numerous holiday dishes arranged according to the mentioned season and holiday since the country has its roots in the Eastern Orthodox Church. Romanian dishes consist of vegetables, cereals, fruits, honey, milk, dairy products, meat and game. 

Multiple different types of dishes are available, which are sometimes included under a generic term; for example, the category ciorbă includes a wide range of soups with a characteristic sour taste. Variations include meat and vegetable soup, tripe (ciorbă de burtă) and calf foot soup, or fish soup, all of which are soured by lemon juice, sauerkraut juice, vinegar, or borș (traditionally made from bran). The category țuică (plum brandy) is a  name for a strong alcoholic spirit in Romania.

History

In the history of Romanian culinary literature, Costache Negruzzi and Mihail Kogălniceanu were the compilers of a cookbook "200 rețete cercate de bucate, prăjituri și alte trebi gospodărești" (200 tried recipes for dishes, pastries and other household things) printed in 1841. Also, Negruzzi writes in "Alexandru Lăpușneanu", "In Moldavia, at this time, fine food wasn't fashioned. The greatest feast only offered a few types of dishes. After the borș, Greek dishes would follow, boiled with herbs floating in butter, and finally cosmopolitan steaks".

Cheese has been a part of Romanian cuisine since ancient history. Brânză is the generic term for cheese in Romanian; it is originally a Dacian word. Traditional Dacian cuisine included vegetables (lentils, peas, spinach, garlic) and fruits (grapes, apples, raspberries) with high nutritional values. The Dacians produced wine in massive quantities. Burebista, a Dacian king, angered by the wine abuse of his warriors, cut down the vines. As such, his people gave up drinking wine. 
Romans helped introduce different pastries made with cheese, including alivenci, pască, or brânzoaice. They also introduced different variations of millet porridge.

Maize and potatoes became staples of Romanian cuisine after their introduction to Europe. Maize, in particular, contributed to health and nutrition improvements of Romanians in the 16th and 17th centuries, resulting in a population boom.

For about three centuries, Wallachia and Moldavia, the two medieval Romanian principalities, were mildly influenced by their various neighbors, like the Ottoman Empire. Ottoman cuisine changed the Romanian table with appetizers made from various vegetables, such as eggplant and bell peppers, as well as various meat preparations, such as chiftele (deep-fried meatballs, a variation of kofta). The various kinds of ciorbă  and meat-and-vegetable stews, such as iahnie de fasole (beans), ardei umpluți (stuffed peppers), and sarmale (stuffed cabbage) are influenced by Turkish cuisine. The Romanian tomato salad is a variation of the Turkish çoban salata.

Description
Romanian recipes bear the same influences as the rest of Romanian culture. The Turks brought meatballs (perișoare in a meatball soup), from the Greeks there is musaca, from the Austrians there is the șnițel, and the list continues. The Romanians share many foods with the Balkan area  and former Austria-Hungary. Some others are original or can be traced to the Romans, as well as other ancient civilizations. The lack of written sources in Eastern Europe makes it impossible to determine today the exact origin for most of them.

One of the most common meals is the mămăligă, the precursor of polenta, served on its own or as an accompaniment. Pork is the main meat used in Romanian cuisine, but also beef is consumed and a good lamb or fish dish is never to be refused.

Before Christmas, on December 20 (Ignat's Day or Ignatul in Romanian), a pig is traditionally sacrificed by every rural family. A variety of foods for Christmas are prepared from the slaughtered pig, such as:
 Cârnați – garlicky pork sausages, which may be smoked or dry-cured;
 Lebăr – an emulsified sausage based on liver with the consistency of the filling ranging from fine (pâté) to coarse;
 Sângerete (black pudding) – an emulsified sausage obtained from a mixture of pig's blood with fat and meat, breadcrumbs or other grains, and spices;
 Tobă (head cheese) – based on pig's feet, ears, and meat from the head suspended in aspic and stuffed in the pig's stomach;
 Tochitură – a stew made with pork, smoked and fresh sausage simmered in a tomato sauce and served with mămăligă and wine ("so that the pork can swim"). There are many variations of this stew throughout Romania, with some versions combining different meats, including chicken, lamb, beef, pork and sometimes even offal;
 Pomana porcului—pan-fried cubed pork served right after the pig's sacrifice to thank the relatives and friends who helped with the process;
 Piftie/răcitură – inferior parts of the pig, mainly the tail, feet, and ears, spiced with garlic and served in aspic;
 Jumări – dried pork remaining from rendering of the fat and tumbled through various spices

The Christmas meal is sweetened with the traditional cozonac, a sweet bread made with nuts, poppy seeds, or rahat (Turkish delight).

At Easter, lamb is served: the main dishes are borș de miel (lamb sour soup), roast lamb, and drob de miel – a Romanian-style lamb haggis made from minced offal (heart, liver, lungs), lamb meat and spring onions with spices, wrapped in a caul and roasted. The traditional Easter cake is pască, a pie made from yeast dough with a sweet cottage cheese filling at the center.

Romanian pancakes, called clătite, are thin (like the French crêpe) and can be prepared with savory or sweet fillings: ground meat, cheese, or jam. Different recipes are prepared depending on the season or the occasion.

Wine is the preferred drink, and Romanian wine has a tradition of over three millennia. Romania is currently the world's ninth largest wine producer, and recently the export market has started to grow. Romania produces a wide selection of domestic varieties (Fetească, Grasă, Tămâioasă, Busuioacă, and Băbească), as well as varieties from across the world (Italian Riesling, Merlot, Sauvignon blanc, Cabernet Sauvignon, Chardonnay, and Muscat Ottonel). Beer is also highly regarded, generally blonde pilsener beer, made with German influences. There are also Romanian breweries with a long tradition.

According to the 2009 data of FAOSTAT, Romania is the world's second largest plum producer (after the United States), and as much as 75% of Romania's plum production is processed into the famous țuică, a plum brandy obtained through one or more distillation steps.

Vegetarianism and veganism
Followers of the Romanian Orthodox Church keep fast during several periods throughout the ecclesiastical calendar amounting to a majority of the year. In the Romanian Orthodox tradition, devotees keep to a diet without any animal products during these times. As a result, vegan foods are abundant in stores and restaurants; however, Romanians may not be familiar with a vegan or vegetarian diet as a full-time lifestyle choice. Many recipes below have vegan versions, and the Vegetables section below contains many common fasting foods.

List of dishes

Soups

 Borș is fermented wheat bran, a souring agent for ciorbă. Borș is also used today as a synonym for ciorbă, but in the past, a distinction was made between borș and ciorbă (acritură), the souring agent for the latter being the juice of unripe fruits, such as grapes, mirabelle, or wood sorrel leaves.
 Borș de burechiușe
 Ciorbă is the traditional Romanian sour soup
 Ciorbă de burtă (tripe soup), with sour cream, egg yolks, garlic and soured with vinegar
 Ciorbă de perișoare (meatball soup)
 Ciorbă de fasole cu afumătură (bean and smoked meat soup)
 Ciorbă de legume (vegetable soup)
 Ciorbă de pește „ca-n Deltă” (fish soup prepared in the style of the Danube Delta) traditionally water directly from the Danube River is used
 Ciorbă de praz is a leek soup
 Ciorbă de pui is a chicken soup
 Ciorbă de lobodă is a red orach soup
 Ciorbă de salată cu afumătură (green lettuce and smoked meat soup) with sour milk
 Ciorbă de sfeclă, also called Borș de sfeclă or Borș rusesc (similar to Borscht)
 Ciorbă de urechiușe, wild mushroom sour soup
 Ciorbă moldovenească de găină is a hen sour soup
 Ciorbă țărănească (peasant soup), made from a variety of vegetables and any kind of meat (beef, pork, mutton, chicken, fish)
 Storceag, fish soup with sour cream and egg, soured with vinegar or lemon juice. 
 Supă (generic name for sweet (usually clear) soups, made from vegetables alone or combined with poultry and beef). The difference between Supă and Ciorbă is that the meat and most of the vegetables are removed, the resulted liquid being served with dumplings or noodles. There are also a number of sour soups, which use lemon juice as a souring agent, called Supe a la grec (Greek soups).
 Supă (de pui) cu găluște (clear dumpling soup with chicken broth)
 Supă (de pui) cu tăiței (clear noodle soup with chicken broth)

Meat

 Caltaboș / chișcă - a cooked sausage made from minced pork organs and rice, onions, herbs (like dill) and spices, stuffed in a pig's casing
 Cârnați - a garlicky sausage, mostly smoked, as in Fasole cu cârnați
 Chiftele - a type of small meatball covered with breadcrumbs or a flour crust
 Ciulama de vițel - veal ciulama
 Ciulama de pui - chicken ciulama
 Drob de miel - a lamb haggis made from minced organs wrapped in a caul and roasted like a meatloaf; a traditional Easter dish
 Frigărui - Romanian-style shish-kebab
 Limbă cu măsline - cow tongue with olives
 Mititei (mici) - grilled minced meat rolls, traditionally made from lamb meat, but usually is found from mixed meats (pork, veal, lamb) with lots of spices (garlic, thime, pepper, paprika etc) 
 Grătar (usually made together with "mici") - grilled pork/beef with condiments
 Musaca - an eggplant, potato, and meat pie
 Ostropel - method of cooking chicken or duck or any meat. It is a slow-cooked fried meat in tomato sauce.
 Papricaș - Chicken paprikash made with bell pepper and paprika 
 Gulaș - Goulash, a stew made with potato and beef
 Pastrami - is a food originating from Romania usually made from beef brisket, or from lamb, pork, chicken or turkey. The raw meat is brined, partially dried, seasoned with herbs and spices, then smoked and steamed. Like corned beef, pastrami was originally created as a way to preserve meat before the invention of refrigeration.
 Pârjoale - a type of meatball bigger than chiftele originally from the Moldova region
 Piftie - the preparation of this dish is similar to the French demi-glace. Pork stock is reduced by simmering, which is placed in containers, and spiced with garlic and sweet paprika powder. The boiled pork meat is then added, and left to cool. The cooled liquid has a gelatinous consistency.
 Pleșcoi sausages - registered as a Romanian protected geographical indication (PGI) product in the European Union
 Rasol
 Salam de Sibiu - a variety of salami registered as a Romanian protected geographical indication (PGI) product in the European Union
 Sarmale - minced meat with rice, onions, erbs, wrapped in either pickled cabbage leaves or vine leaves and boiled for a few hours in water with tomato paste. There are also many vegan varieties. 
 Slănină - pork fat, often smoked with paprika, erbs and pepper 
 Shawarma - locally known as Șaormă, it is one of the most popular street foods in the country 
 Șnițel - a pork, veal, or beef breaded cutlet (a variety of Viennese schnitzel)
 Cordon bleu șnițel - breaded pork tenderloin stuffed with ham and cheese
 Mozaic șnițel - a specialty of Western Romania, which is two thin layers of different meats with a mushroom filling. Other vegetable fillings may be used instead of mushrooms.
 Șnițel de pui - breaded chicken breast cutlet
 Stufat - lamb, onion, and garlic stew
 Tobă - pork sausage (usually pig's stomach, stuffed with pork jelly, liver, and skin)
 Tocană/tocaniță - meat stew
 Tocăniță vânătorească - venison stew
 Tochitură - pan-fried cubed pork, fresh salty cheese (brânză de burduf or telemea), fried eggs, sausages served with mămăligă and wine
 Varză călită - fried cabbage with pork ribs, duck, or sausages
 Virșli - a type of sausage made from a mixture of goat or lamb with pork

Fish

 Chiftele de pește - fish meatballs 
 Crap pane - breaded carp fillet
 Ghiveci cu pește - fish stew with vegetables
 Macrou afumat - smoked mackerel fillet
 Novac afumat din Țara Bârsei - smoked carp fillet, registered as a Romanian protected geographical indication (PGI) product in the European Union
 Pană de somn rasol - catfish in brine with garlic
 Plachie din pește - ragout of river fish with vegetables
 Papricaș de pește - fish papricaș
 Salată de icre - roe salad, traditionally made from carp, pike, or various marine fish species, called tarama, with onion
 Salată cu icre de știucă de Tulcea - a variety of Salată de icre registered as a Romanian protected geographical indication (PGI) product in the European Union
 Salata tradițională cu icre de crap - another variety of Salată de icre registered as a Romanian protected geographical indication (PGI) product in the European Union
 Saramură de carp - carp in brine
 Scrumbie de Dunăre afumată - smoked pontic shad, registered as a Romanian protected geographical indication (PGI) product in the European Union

Vegetables

 Ardei umpluți - stuffed bell peppers with meat, rice, onions
 Dovlecei umpluți - stuffed zucchini
 Gulii umplute - stuffed kohlrabi
 Vinete umplute - stuffed eggplant
 Sarmale - stuffed cabbage rolls, also made from grape or dock leaves
 Ghiveci - Romania's national dish; a vegetable stew similar to the Bulgarian gjuvec and the Hungarian lecsó
 Ghiveci cǎlugăresc - vegetable stew prepared by the nuns in the monasteries
 Fasole batută - bean paste made from Romanian refried beans, uses white or cannellini beans, with the addition of olive or sunflower oil and minced garlic. The dish is traditionally served with fried onions as a garnish.
 Mămăligă - cornmeal mush, also known as Romanian-style polenta. Mămăligă can be served as a side dish or form the basis of further dishes, such as mămăligă cu lapte (polenta with hot milk), bulz (baked polenta with Romanian sheep cheese and sour cream), mămăliguță cu brânză și smântănă (polenta with telemea (Romanian cheese similar to feta) and sour cream), etc. 
 Mâncare de mazăre - pea stew
 Mâncare de praz - leek stew
 Pilaf - a dish of rice, vegetables, and pieces of meat (optional). The meat is usually the offal, wings, and organs of chicken, pork, or lamb. The cooking method is very similar to risotto.
 Chifteluțe de ciuperci - chiftele made from mushrooms instead of meat
 Șnițel de ciuperci - mushroom fritter (șnițel is the Romanian spelling of the German word schnitzel (breaded boneless cutlet), but it may be used to mean any sort of fritter)
 Tocană de ciuperci - mushroom stew made with fried mushrooms, garlic and dill (sometimes sour cream is added) 
 Tocăniță de gălbiori - chanterelle stew
 Zacuscă - vegetable spread consisting of roasted eggplant, sauteed onions, tomato paste, and roasted red peppers cooked for a long time at a small temperature

List of salads

 Ardei copți - roasted pepper salad, with vinegar and sunflower
 Murături - method of pickling different fruits and vegetables
 Castraveți murați - pickled small cucumbers with dill, garlic and parsley root
 Gogonele murate - pickled green tomatoes, which is the simple version of murături asortate
 Varză murată - cabbage pickled in brine, flavored with dill stalks and beetroots for red colour.
 Murături asortate - pickled mixed vegetables; a combination of any of the following: onions, garlic, green tomatoes, peppers, cucumbers, kohlrabi, beets, carrots, celery, parsley roots, cauliflower, apples, quince, unripe plums, small unripe watermelons, small zucchini, and red cabbage. It is most often cured in brine (Turkish version), though it can also be cured in vinegar (German version).
 Mujdei - crushed garlic sauce, made from garlic, salt, oil and water (for a mild taste can be added lemon or tomatoes) 
 Salată de boeuf - minced boiled meat with boiled vegetables, mayonnaise, and pickles 
 Salată de vinete - roasted and peeled eggplant, chopped onions, and salt mixed with oil or mayonnaise
 Salată orientală - potato salad with eggs, onions, and olives
 Salată de sfeclă - beet salad
 Salată de roșii - tomato salad, with sliced onions, bell peppers, and cucumber. Flavored with dill or parsley.
 Shopska salad - known locally as Bulgarian salad, it is made from tomatoes, cucumbers, onion/scallions, raw or roasted peppers, telemea, and parsley. The vegetables are usually diced and salted, followed by a light dressing of sunflower/olive oil complemented with vinegar

List of cheeses

The generic name for cheese in Romania is brânză, and it is considered to be of Dacian origin. Most of the cheeses are made from cow's or sheep's milk. Goat's milk is rarely used. Sheep cheese is considered "the real cheese", although in modern times, some people refrain from consuming it due to its higher fat content and specific smell.

 Brânză de burduf is a kneaded cheese prepared from sheep's milk and traditionally stuffed into a sheep's stomach; it has a strong taste and semi-soft texture
 Brânză topită is a melted cheese and a generic name for processed cheese, industrial product
 Brânză în coșuleț is a sheep's milk, kneaded cheese with a strong taste and semi-soft texture, stuffed into bellows of fir tree bark instead of pig bladder, very lightly smoked, traditional product
 Caș is a semi-soft fresh white cheese, unsalted or lightly salted, stored in brine, which is eaten fresh (cannot be preserved), traditional, seasonal product
 Cașcaval is a semi-hard cheese made from sheep's or cow's milk, traditional product. The Cașcaval de Săveni is a type of cașcaval published as a Romanian protected geographical indication (PGI) product in the European Union.
 Penteleu, a type of cașcaval, traditional product
 Năsal cheese is a type of cheese with a pungent aroma, traditional product
 Șvaițer, industrial product ("Schweizer Käse")
 Telemea, cow's or sheep's milk white cheese, vaguely similar to feta. The traditional "Telemea de Ibănești" is a type of telemea registered as a Romanian protected designation of origin (PDO) product in the European Union, while the "Telemea de Sibiu" is registered as a Romanian protected geographical indication (PGI) product in the European Union. Notably the "Telemea de Covurlui" is spiced with Nigella damascena seeds, which gives it a unique flavor.
 Urdă - made by boiling the whey drained from cow's or ewe's milk until the remaining proteins precipitate and can be collected, traditional product
Zămătișe - a type of cottage cheese.

List of desserts
Alivenci, corn and cheese pie in sweet and salted variants. Traditional dessert in Eastern Romania and Moldova.

 

 Amandine - chocolate sponge cake with almond and chocolate filling, glazed in chocolate
 Baclava 
 Brânzoaice (Poale-n brâu moldovenești) - traditional Moldavian soft cakes filled with sweet cheese
 Cataife
 Chec - pound cake
 Clătite - crêpes (literally: pancakes)
 Colivă - boiled wheat, mixed with sugar and walnuts (often decorated with candy and icing sugar; distributed at funerals and memorial ceremonies)
 Colțunași
 Cornulețe - pastries filled  jam, chocolate, cinnamon sugar, walnuts, or raisins, with the shape representing a crescent
 Covrigi - pretzel
 Cozonac - a kind of Stollen made from leavened dough, into which milk, eggs, sugar, butter, and other ingredients are mixed together before baking 
 Cremă de zahăr ars - Crème brûlée
 Cremeș 
Găluști cu prune - dumplings with plums, a dessert made of mashed potatoes and flour dough and filled with fresh plums
 Gogoși - literally "doughnuts", but more akin to fried dough
 Griș cu lapte
 Halva
 Joffre cake - invented at the Casa Capșa restaurant in Bucharest
 Lapte de pasăre - literally "bird's milk", vanilla custard garnished with "floating islands" of whipped egg whites
 Magiun of Topoloveni - a type of plum jam, registered as a Romanian protected geographical indication (PGI) product in the European Union
 Mucenici/sfințișori - sweet pastries (shaped like "8", made from boiled or baked dough, garnished with walnuts, sugar, or honey, eaten on a single day of the year, on 9 March)
 Orez cu lapte - Rice pudding
 Pandișpan - Sponge cake
 Papanași - a kind of doughnut made from a mixture of sweet cheese, eggs, and semolina, boiled or fried and served with fruit syrup or jam and sour cream
 Pelincile Domnului - a Moldavian type of pie made of honey-flavoured thin wheat cakes and hemp seed cream. Less and less exposure because of the confusion between Cannabis sativa (traditionally cultivated in Romania) and Cannabis indica (the THC-rich variety)
 Plăcintă - traditional pastry
 Plăcintă dobrogeană - a type of plăcintă registered as a Romanian protected geographical indication (PGI) product in the European Union
 Prăjituri - assorted pastries
 Rahat - Turkish delight
 Chocolate salami - salam de biscuiți(literally „salami of biscuits"), made from biscuits, chocolate, and rum essence. The cylindrical shape resembles a sausage, hence the name.
 Savarine - savarina
 Scovergi - flat fried dough. It is eaten with honey, jam or cheese.
 Șarlotă - a custard made from milk, eggs, sugar, whipped cream, gelatin, fruits, and ladyfingers; from the French Charlotte
 Tort - cake
 Tulumba 
 Turtă dulce - gingerbread

List of drinks
 Afinată - a liqueur made from afine (aka. bilberry in English), which are similar to the North American blueberry.
 Bere
 Cafea
 Ceai - prepared in the form of either various plant tisanes (chamomile, mint, tilly flower, etc.) or common black tea, called ceai rusesc in Romanian, which is Russian tea usually served during breakfast.
 Horincă is a plum or apple brandy, produced in the northern part of the country (Maramureș)
 Must - the grape juice in the fermentation process that hasn't become wine yet.
 Pălincă is a strong, double-distilled fruit brandy (especially plum, but also apple, apricots, peach, pear etc.) produced in Transylvania
 Pelin de mai is a wine specialty, usually produced in the spring, flavored with Artemisia dried plants
 Rachiu is a fruit brandy. Generic "rachiu" can be made from any fruit (except plums), while "țuică" is reserved exclusively for the variety of brandy made from plums.
 Rachiu de tescovină is a pomace brandy produced from grapes that have been used in wine production, very similar to the Italian grappa
 Sana is a kind of a drinkable yogurt 
 Secărică is a caraway fruit flavored vodka, similar to the German kümmel
 Sirop - prepared with syrup made from fir tree, pine, buckthorn, blueberry, raspberry, or strawberry, with different types of honey or sugar
 Socată is a non-alcoholic beverage made from fermented elderflower (Sambucus nigra)
 Șliboviță is a plum brandy, produced in the Banat region.
 Turț is a strong, double-distilled plum brandy, named after the village of Turț in northwestern Romania
 Țuică is a plum brandy
 Vin
 Vișinată is a sour cherry liqueur
 Vodcă
 Zmeurată is a raspberry liqueur

See also 

 Beer in Romania
 Moldovan cuisine
 Transylvanian Saxon cuisine

Notes and references

Other sources 

 Nicolae Klepper, Taste of Romania, Hippocrene, New York, 1999, 

Romanian cuisine
Cuisine
European cuisine
Balkan cuisine